Nassau County Route 8 is an unsigned county road in Nassau County, New York. It travels between Old Country Road (CR 25) and Rockaway Avenue (CR E06) in Garden City and Northern Boulevard (NY 25A) in Manhasset.

Route description

Southern segment (Herricks Road) 
The route starts as Herricks Road at the intersection of Old Country Road (CR 25) and Rockaway Avenue (CR E06) in the Incorporated Village of Garden City (located within the Town of Hempstead). From there, it continues north underneath the Main Line of the Long Island Rail Road, entering into the Town of North Hempstead. From the railroad tracks, it continues north to Jericho Turnpike (NY 25), forming the boundary between the unincorporated hamlet of Garden City Park to the west and the Incorporated Village of Mineola to the east. Continuing north from Jericho Turnpike, County Route 8 continues north to Hillside Avenue (NY 25B), still as Herricks Road and forming the border between the two communities. North of Hillside Avenue, Herricks Road enters into the unincorporated hamlet of Herricks, and continues north through the hamlet to its intersection with Searingtown Road (CR 101) and Shelter Rock Road, where Herricks Road ends. At this intersection, the alignment of County Route 8 turns west onto Shelter Rock Road.

Northern segment (Shelter Rock Road) 

From the intersection with Herricks Road, Searingtown Road (CR 101), and Shelter Rock Road, Nassau County Route 8 follows Shelter Rock Road west and north through Herricks, passing Herricks High School and forming the border between Herricks and unincorporated Manhasset Hills, as well as some of the Herricks–North Hills village border. It continues north to I.U. Willets Road, entering completely into the Incorporated Village of North Hills. Continuing north, Shelter Rock Road crosses over the Northern State Parkway and then the Long Island Expressway (Interstate 495). It then continues north through North Hills and then straddling the North Hills–Manhasset border, passing the historic Shelter Rock (for which the road is named), and ending just over the North Hills–Manhasset border at Northern Boulevard (NY 25A). Additionally, when in use, the Long Island Motor Parkway crossed Shelter Rock Road.

In the early 1960s, Shelter Rock Road's alignment was straightened and modernized through its northern stretch; remaining portions of the old alignment are now known as Old Shelter Rock Road.

Major intersections

1982 Herricks Road train crash 
On March 14, 1982, a Long Island Rail Road passenger train struck a van with 10 teenagers inside at the former Herricks Road grade crossing at 2:18 AM, killing the 19-year-old driver and 8 of the 9 passengers, while leaving the lone surviving van passenger in critical condition. The teenagers were attempting to beat the train and drove around the lowered gates when the train struck their van. The National Transportation Safety Board labeled the Herricks Road grade crossing as being the most hazardous in the United States, what with an average of 20,000 cars and 200 trains traversing the grade crossing daily.

Following the crash, the grade crossing at Herricks Road was eliminated. An underpass was constructed to allow CR 8 to travel underneath the Long Island Rail Road's Main Line instead of intersecting it at-grade. The bridge carrying the tracks over Herricks Road opened on April 28, 1998, after 5 years of construction.

See also 

 List of county routes in Nassau County, New York

References 

008